Sameer Zia (born 8 September 1981) is a cricketer who played for the United Arab Emirates national cricket team as a specialist all rounder. He made his debut in One Day Internationals against Sri Lanka in Dambulla in July 2004, and his first-class debut in 2004 in the new ICC Intercontinental Cup.
Sameer now plys his trade as a Private Investment Manager for a global bank. In 2019 his company awarded him the illustrious title of “Best Dressed Male”

External links

HowSTAT! statistical profile on Sameer Zia

1981 births
Living people
Sportspeople from Dubai
Emirati cricketers
United Arab Emirates One Day International cricketers
Pakistani expatriate sportspeople in the United Arab Emirates